IPMC may refer to:

 Ionic polymer-metal composite or compound
 Intelligent platform management controller, in Advanced Telecommunications Computing Architecture

 IPMI Management Controller, in Hardware Platform Interface
IP Multicast